Donna is a tiny lunar crater on the near side of the Moon. Its name is an Italian female given name, and does not refer to a specific person. It is located in the eastern half of the Mare Tranquillitatis, at the summit of the lunar dome Omega (ω) Cauchy. As such domes are thought to be volcanic in nature, it appears likely that this crater was created by an eruption. This is in contrast to most lunar craters, which are now believed to be created by impacts. This crater is sufficiently small that it requires a large telescope to resolve.

To the north of this crater is a fault line in the lunar mare designated Rupes Cauchy. It is named after the crater Cauchy, which lies farther to the north. To the west-northwest of Donna is a second lunar dome designated Tau (τ) Cauchy, which lacks a craterlet at the summit.

References

External links
 Donna, Lunar Topophotomap 61D2S1(50)

Further reading

 
 
 
 
 
 
 
 
 
 
 

Impact craters on the Moon